David Giles may refer to:
David Giles (director) (1926–2010), British television director
David Giles (footballer) (born 1956), Welsh former footballer
David Giles (sailor) (born 1964), Australian competitive sailor